Events from the year 1768 in Scotland.

Incumbents

Law officers 
 Lord Advocate – James Montgomery
 Solicitor General for Scotland – Henry Dundas

Judiciary 
 Lord President of the Court of Session – Lord Arniston, the younger
 Lord Justice General – Duke of Queensberry
 Lord Justice Clerk – Lord Barskimming

Events 
 10 June – construction of Forth and Clyde Canal begins (Act 8 March).
 10 December – first volumes of Encyclopædia Britannica begin publication in Edinburgh.
 Bridge over River Deveron between Banff and Macduff swept away in flood.
 David Dale begins his own business importing linen yarn from the Dutch Republic to Glasgow.
 Duchal House extended.
 Alloa Waggonway open.

Births 
 2 May – Zachary Macaulay, abolitionist and statistician (died 1838 in London)
 3 May – Charles Tennant, chemist and industrialist (died 1838)
 9 May – James Thomson, Presbyterian minister and editor of Encyclopædia Britannica (died 1855 in London)
 11 May – David Hamilton, Glasgow architect (died 1843)
 14 July – James Haldane, soldier and evangelist (died 1851)
 29 August (bapt.) – William Erskine, Lord Kinneder, scholar and songwriter (died 1822)
 23 September – William Wallace, mathematician (died 1843)
 6 November – James Hay Beattie, poet (died 1790)
 10 November – Thomas Thomson, advocate, antiquarian and archivist (died 1852)

Deaths 
 15 June – James Short, mathematician and optician (born 1710)
 1 October – Robert Simson, mathematician (born 1687)
 12 October – James Douglas, 14th Earl of Morton, astronomer (born 1702)

References 

 
Years of the 18th century in Scotland
Scotland
1760s in Scotland